Elena Dementieva was the defending champion, but lost in the third round to Zheng Jie.

Caroline Wozniacki won the tournament by defeating Vera Zvonareva 6–3, 6–2 in the final.

Seeds
The top eight seeds receive a bye into the second round.

Main draw

Finals

Top half

Section 1

Section 2

Bottom half

Section 3

Section 4

External links
 Main Draw and Qualifying Draw

Rogers Cup
Singles
Rogers